<onlyinclude>

May 2022

See also

References

killings by law enforcement officers
 05